Ali Mohamed Badawi Abdel Fattah (born 24 May 1935 – 6 December 2007) is an Egyptian former footballer who played as a midfielder for the Egyptian national team. He took part in the 1962 Africa Cup of Nations, and was the tournament's joint top scorer. He also represented his country in the 1964 Summer Olympics.

International career
He represented Egypt in 1962 African Cup of Nations and the 1964 Summer Olympics.

Honors

Individual
African Cup of Nations Top Scorer: 1962 (shared with Mengistu Worku)

References

External links 
 

1935 births
2007 deaths
Sportspeople from Port Said
Egyptian footballers
Association football midfielders
Egypt international footballers
Olympic footballers of Egypt
Footballers at the 1964 Summer Olympics
1962 African Cup of Nations players
Olympic Club (Egypt) players
Tersana SC players